Juan Carlos Ferrero was the defending champion; however, he chose not to defend his title due to knee and wrist injuries.
Nicolás Almagro claimed the title by defeating Alexandr Dolgopolov 6–3, 7–6(3) in the final.

Seeds
The top four seeds receive a bye into the second round. 

  Nicolás Almagro (champion)
  Albert Montañés (second round)
  Thomaz Bellucci (quarterfinals)
  Alexandr Dolgopolov (final)
  Juan Ignacio Chela (semifinals)
  Tommy Robredo (second round)
  Potito Starace (quarterfinals)
  Victor Hănescu (first round)

Qualifying

Draw

Finals

Top half

Bottom half

References
 Main Draw
 Qualifying Draw

Brasil Open - Singles
Singles